Maria Djurkovic is a British  production designer for film and television.

Career
Djurkovic has Czech, Russian and Montenegrin roots and spent a lot of time in the former Yugoslavia in her childhood. She studied at the University of Oxford and began her film career in the mid 1980s. Since then she has been involved in around 30 film and television productions.

At the 2015 Academy Awards, she and Tatiana Macdonald were nominated  in the Best Production Design category for their work on The Imitation Game. In particular, she was responsible for the reconstruction of Alan Turing's bombe, for which she was given access to the archives of Bletchley Park, where Turing and his colleagues worked on deciphering the German military's Enigma code during the Second World War.

Filmography

Television

Film

Awards
Nominated, Academy Award for Best Production Design for The Imitation Game
Nominated, BAFTA Award for Best Production Design for The Imitation Game

References

External links
 

British people of Montenegrin descent
British people of Czech descent
British people of Russian descent
British art directors
Living people
Year of birth missing (living people)
Women production designers
British production designers